Jeff Darlington (born November 10, 1981 in Elizabeth, New Jersey) is an American television reporter with ESPN, where he appears on such shows as SportsCenter and NFL Countdown. He is known for high-level interviews with NFL stars like Antonio Brown, Tom Brady and Jared Goff. He previously covered the NFL for the NFL Network and NFL.com from 2011 to 2016. For six seasons prior to 2011, he covered the Miami Dolphins for The Miami Herald. In 2010, he was named South Florida's "Best Sports Writer." Darlington still resides in Fort Lauderdale but is often traveling to NFL cities.

Jeff Darlington has covered sports in Florida – including college football and the NFL – since 2000. Before covering the NFL and the Dolphins, he wrote about the football and men's basketball programs at the University of Florida for the Orlando Sentinel. Darlington also is a graduate of UF.

Darlington appeared briefly in a cameo role with Kevin Costner in the movie Draft Day.

Darlington attended Seminole High School in Seminole, Florida.

References

External links
 Jeff Darlington's Twitter Page
 

1981 births
American sportswriters
Disney people
ESPN people
Living people
Writers from Elizabeth, New Jersey
Seminole High School (Pinellas County, Florida) alumni
University of Florida alumni
National Football League announcers